The 1960 Australian Championships was a tennis tournament that took place on outdoor Grass courts at the Milton Courts, Brisbane, Australia from 22 January to 1 February. It was the 48th edition of the Australian Championships (now known as the Australian Open), the 5th held in Brisbane, and the first Grand Slam tournament of the year. The singles titles were won by Rod Laver and Margaret Smith.

Champions

Men's singles

 Rod Laver defeated  Neale Fraser  5–7, 3–6, 6–3, 8–6, 8–6

Women's singles

 Margaret Smith defeated  Jan Lehane 7–5, 6–2

Men's doubles
 Rod Laver /  Bob Mark defeated  Roy Emerson /  Neale Fraser 1–6, 6–2, 6–4, 6–4

Women's doubles
 Maria Bueno /  Christine Truman defeated  Lorraine Robinson /  Margaret Smith 6–2, 5–7, 6–2

Mixed doubles
 Jan Lehane /  Trevor Fancutt defeated  Mary Carter Reitano /  Bob Mark 6–2, 7–5

References

External links
 Australian Open official website

Australian Championships
Australian Championships (tennis) by year
January 1960 sports events in Australia
February 1960 sports events in Australia